The 2012–13 season was Annan Athletic's fifth consecutive season in the Scottish Third Division, having been admitted to the Scottish Football League at the start of the 2008–09 season. Annan also competed in the Challenge Cup, League Cup and the Scottish Cup.

Summary

Season
Annan Athletic finished eighth in the Scottish Third Division. They reached the second round of the Challenge Cup, the first round of the League Cup and the second round of the Scottish Cup.

Management
They began the season under the management of Harry Cairney. On 21 December 2012, Cairney resigned as manager citing personal reasons with Euan Brydson taking over as manager on an interim basis. On 12 January 2013, Jim Chapman was appointed as the club's new manager.

Results & fixtures

Pre-season

Scottish Third Division

Scottish Challenge Cup

Scottish League Cup

Scottish Cup

Player statistics

Squad 
Last updated 13 May 2013 

|}

Disciplinary record
Includes all competitive matches.
Last updated 13 May 2013

Team statistics

League table

Division summary

Transfers

Players in

Players out

See also
List of Annan Athletic F.C. seasons

References

2012andndash;13
Annan Athletic